Commodore John Cassin (July 7, 1760March 24, 1822) was a United States Navy officer, who led the vital defense of Gosport Navy Yard during the War of 1812 and served as its Commandant.

Early life 
Cassin, born in Philadelphia, Pennsylvania on July 7, 1760, was the son of Joseph Cassin, who was born in Dublin, Ireland, and came to Philadelphia in 1725.

Military service 
During the American Revolutionary War, Cassin served in the Army and took part in the Battle of Trenton.

In 1803, Cassin was assigned as second officer at the Washington Navy Yard.

During the War of 1812 he led the United States Navy in the Delaware for the defense of Philadelphia. He also commanded the Norfolk Naval Shipyard from 10 August 1812 until 1 June 1821. After that he was the commanding officer of the Southern Naval station, Charleston, South Carolina.

Family 
In the early 1780s Cassin married Ann Wilcox (1754–1821) of Philadelphia. They had four children: Elizabeth Ann Cassin (married Captain Joseph Tarbell), Joseph Cassin (1784–1821), Stephen Cassin, and John Cassin (b.1791, died young). Joseph and Stephen were Navy officers.

Death 
He died on March 24, 1822 in Charleston, South Carolina.

References

External links
 

1760 births
1822 deaths
United States Navy officers
United States Navy personnel of the War of 1812
American revolutionaries
19th-century American naval officers
Military personnel from Philadelphia
People of colonial Pennsylvania
Burials in South Carolina